The Allen was an American automobile, built at Fostoria, Ohio between 1913 and 1921.  The company used 3.1-litre side-valve Sommers four-cylinder engines, and acquired that company in 1915.  The 1920 Allen 43 was a handsome craft, featuring bevel-sided touring coachwork and a high-shouldered radiator.  Unfortunately, sales of this vehicle were not enough to avert the company's bankruptcy, which followed in 1921.  Willys acquired what little was left. Overall, 20,00 vehicles were sold.

Confusingly, another American company also offered a car called the Allen, also in 1913, though the Ohio model was somewhat more successful.

References

Brass Era vehicles
Defunct motor vehicle manufacturers of the United States
Motor vehicle manufacturers based in Ohio
Fostoria, Ohio
Vehicle manufacturing companies established in 1913
Vehicle manufacturing companies disestablished in 1921
1913 establishments in Ohio
1921 disestablishments in Ohio
Defunct manufacturing companies based in Ohio